White Lies is a 1934 American crime film directed by Leo Bulgakov and starring Victor Jory, Fay Wray, and Walter Connolly.

The film was produced by Columbia Pictures. The screenwriter was Harold Shumate.

The film is featured in the book A Guide to American Crime Films of the Thirties.

Plot
According to the British Film Institute, the film is about a "ruthless newspaper proprietor who sacrifices everything to have sensational headlines, is put to the test when his daughter is accused of murder."

Cast
Victor Jory as Terry Condon
Fay Wray as Joan Mitchell
Walter Connolly as John Mitchell
Leslie Fenton as Dan Oliver
Irene Hervey as Mary Mollory
Robert Allen as Arthur Bradford
William Demarest as Roberts
Oscar Apfel

References 

1935 films
1935 drama films
American drama films
American black-and-white films
Columbia Pictures films
1930s American films
1930s English-language films